Esperanto is a constructed international auxiliary language designed to have a simple phonology. The creator of Esperanto, L. L. Zamenhof, described Esperanto pronunciation by comparing the sounds of Esperanto with the sounds of several major European languages.

With over a century of use, Esperanto has developed a phonological norm, including accepted details of phonetics, phonotactics, and intonation, so that it is now possible to speak of proper Esperanto pronunciation and of properly formed words independently of the languages originally used to describe it. This norm accepts only minor allophonic variation.

Inventory
The original Esperanto lexicon contains:

 23 consonants (including ĥ , which has become rare, and 4 affricates)
 11 vowels (5 simple vowels and 6 diphthongs).

Consonants

'a check'). The letter ŭ is sometimes used as a consonant in onomatopoeia and unassimilated foreign names, in addition to the second element in diphthongs, which some argue is consonantal /w/ rather than vocalic  (see below).

Vowels
Esperanto has between 5 and 11 vowels, depending on analysis: 5 monophthongs and up to 6 diphthongs. 

Origins
The Esperanto sound inventory and phonotactics are very close to those of Yiddish, Belarusian and Polish, which were personally important to Zamenhof, the creator of Esperanto. The Esperanto vowel inventory is essentially that of Belarusian. Zamenhof's Litvish dialect of Yiddish (that of Białystok) has an additional schwa and diphthong oŭ but no uj.

Orthography and pronunciation

The Esperanto alphabet is nearly phonemic. The letters, along with the IPA and nearest English equivalent of their principal allophones, are:

Minimal pairs
Esperanto has many minimal pairs between the voiced and voiceless plosives, b d g and p t k; for example,  "pay" vs.  "pack",  "bar" vs.  "pair",  "briefcase" vs.  "group of ten".

On the other hand, the distinctions between several Esperanto consonants carry very light functional loads, though they are not in complementary distribution and therefore not allophones. The practical effect of this is that people who do not control these distinctions are still able to communicate without difficulty.

Belarusian seems to have provided the model for Esperanto's diphthongs, as well as the complementary distribution of v (restricted to the onset of a syllable), and ŭ (occurring only as a vocalic offglide), although this was modified slightly, with Belarusian oŭ corresponding to Esperanto ov (as in ), and ŭ being restricted to the sequences  in Esperanto. (However, Zamenhof did allow initial ŭ in onomatopoeic words such as  'wah!'.) The semivowel j likewise does not occur after the vowel i, but is also restricted from occurring before i in the same morpheme, whereas the Belarusian letter i represents .

Stress and prosody

An exception is when the final -o of a noun is elided, usually for poetic reasons, because this does not affect the placement of the stress: {{lang|eo|fami'li</b>'}} .

On the rare occasions that stress needed to be specified, as in explanatory material or with proper names, Zamenhof used an acute accent. The most common such proper name is Zamenhof's own: . If the stress falls on the last syllable, it is common for an apostrophe to be used, as in poetic elision: .

There is no set rule for which other syllables might receive stress in a polysyllabic word, or which monosyllabic words are stressed in a clause. Morphology, semantic load, and rhythm all play a role. By default, Esperanto is trochaic; stress tends to hit alternate syllables: . They never stress an epenthetic vowel: thus , not .

Within a clause, rhythm also plays a role. The verb  ('to be') behaves similarly, as can be seen by the occasional elision of the e in poetry or rapid speech:  ('I'm not here!') Phonological words do not necessarily match orthographic words. Pronouns, prepositions, the article, and other monosyllabic function words are generally pronounced as a unit with the following word:  ('I have'),  ('the boy'),  ('of the word'),  ('at table'). Exceptions include  'and', which may be pronounced more distinctly when it has a larger scope than the following word or phrase.

Within poetry, of course, the meter determines stress:  ('Oh my heart, do not beat uneasily').

Emphasis and contrast may override normal stress. Pronouns frequently take stress because of this. In a simple question like  ('Did you see?'), the pronoun hardly needs to be said and is unstressed; compare  and ('No, give me). Within a word, a prefix that wasn't heard correctly may be stressed upon repetition:  ('No, not over there! Go left, I said!'). Because stress doesn't distinguish words in Esperanto, shifting it to an unexpected syllable calls attention to that syllable, but doesn't cause confusion as it might in English.

As in many languages, initialisms behave unusually. When grammatical, they may be unstressed: k.t.p.  ('et cetera'); when used as proper names, they tend to be idiosyncratic:   or  but rarely . This seems to be a way of indicating that the term is not a normal word. However, full acronyms tend to have regular stress:  .

Lexical tone is not phonemic. Nor is clausal intonation, as question particles and changes in word order serve many of the functions that intonation performs in English.

Phonotactics

A syllable in Esperanto is generally of the form (s/ŝ)(C)(C)V(C)(C). That is, it may have an onset, of up to three consonants; must have a nucleus of a single vowel or diphthong (except in onomatopoeic words such as zzz!), and may have a coda of zero to one (occasionally two) consonants.

Any consonant may occur initially, with the exception of j before i (though there is now one word that violates this restriction,  ('Yiddish') which contrasts with  "of an offspring").

Any consonant except h may close a syllable, though coda ĝ and ĵ are rare in monomorphemes (they contrast in  'age' vs.  'thing'). Long clusters generally include a sibilant such as s or one of the liquids l or r.

Word-final consonants occur, though final voiced obstruents are generally rejected. For example, Latin  ('to') became Esperanto , and Polish  ('than') morphed into Esperanto  ('than'). Sonorants and voiceless obstruents, on the other hand, are found in many of the numerals:  ('hundred'),  ('eight'),  ('seven'),  ('six'),  ('five'),  ('four'); also  ('during'),  ('even'). Even the poetic elision of final -o is rarely seen if it would leave a final voiced obstruent. This is because many people, including the Slavs and Germans, do not contrast voicing in final obstruents. For similar reasons, sequences of obstruents with mixed voicing are not found in Zamenhofian compounds, apart from numerals and grammatical forms, thus  'for a long time', not . (Note that  is an exception to this rule, like in the Slavic languages. It is effectively ambiguous between fricative and approximant.

Syllabic consonants occur only as interjections and onomatopoeia: .

All triconsonantal onsets begin with a sibilant, s or ŝ.

Stop + liquid – bl, br; pl, pr; dr; tr; gl, gr; kl, krVoiceless fricative + liquid – fl, fr; sl; ŝl, ŝrVoiceless sibilant + voiceless stop (+ liquid) – sc , sp, spl, spr; st, str; sk, skl, skr;  ŝp, ŝpr; ŝt, ŝtrObstruent + nasal – gn, kn, sm, sn, ŝm, ŝnObstruent +  – gv, kv, sv, ŝvAnd more marginally,

(The  phonemes are presumably devoiced in these words.)

As this might suggest, greater phonotactic diversity and complexity is tolerated in learnèd than in quotidian words, almost as if "difficult" phonotactics were an iconic indication of "difficult" vocabulary. Diconsonantal codas, for example, generally only occur in technical terms, proper names, and in geographical and ethnic terms:  ('a conjunction'),  ('Arctic'),  ('isthmus').

However, there is a strong tendency for more basic terms to avoid coda clusters, although  ('hundred'),  ('after'),  ('holy'), and the prefix  ('ex-') (which can be used as an interjection:  'Down with the king!') are exceptions. Even when coda clusters occur in the source languages, they are often eliminated in Esperanto.

However, these roots do not normally entail coda clusters except when followed by another consonant in compounds, or with poetic elision of the final -o. Even then, only sequences with decreasing sonority are possible, so although poetic  occurs, *, *, and * do not. (Note that the humorous jargon  does not follow this restriction, because it elides the grammatical suffix of all nouns no matter how awkward the result.)

Within compounds, an epenthetic vowel is added to break up what would otherwise be unacceptable clusters of consonants. There is a great deal of personal variation as to when an epenthetic vowel is used.

Allophonic variation

Alveolar consonants t, d, n, l are acceptably either apical (as in English) or laminal (as in French, generally but incorrectly called "dental"). Postalveolars ĉ, ĝ, ŝ, ĵ may be palato-alveolar (semi-palatalized)  as in English and French, or retroflex (non-palatalized)  as in Polish, Russian, and Mandarin Chinese. H and ĥ may be voiced , especially between vowels. 

Rhotics
The consonant r can be realised in many ways, as it was defined differently in each language version of the Fundamento de Esperanto:

 In the French Fundamento, it is defined as r. The French rhotic has a wide range of realizations: both the voiced uvular fricative or approximant  and the voiceless uvular fricative , the uvular trill , the alveolar trill , and the alveolar tap . These are all recognized as the phoneme , but the trills and the tap are considered dialectal.
 In the English Fundamento, it is defined as in rare, which is an alveolar approximant .
 In the German Fundamento, it is defined as r. The alveolar pronunciation  is used in some standard German varieties of Germany, Austria, and Switzerland.
 In the Russian and Polish Fundamento, it is defined as р (cyrillic), which is most commonly an alveolar trill .

The most common realization depends on the region and native language of the Esperanto speaker. For example, a very common realisation in English speaking countries is the alveolar flap . Worldwide, the most common realisation is probably the alveolar trill , which makes some people think it is the most desirable pronunciation. However, it is a common misconception to believe that the alveolar trill is the only correct form. The grammar reference Plena Manlibro de Esperanta Gramatiko considers the velar form to be totally good if it is trilled, and considers the other realisations acceptable. In practice, the different forms are well understood and accepted by experienced Esperanto speakers.

Vowel length and quality
Vowel length is not phonemic in Esperanto. Vowels tend to be long in open stressed syllables and short otherwise. Adjacent stressed syllables are not allowed in compound words, and when stress disappears in such situations, it may leave behind a residue of vowel length. Vowel length is sometimes presented as an argument for the phonemic status of the affricates, because vowels tend to be short before most consonant clusters (excepting stops plus l or r, as in many European languages), but long before /ĉ/, /ĝ/, /c/, and /dz/, though again this varies by speaker, with some speakers pronouncing a short vowel before /ĝ/, /c/, /dz/ and a long vowel only before /ĉ/.

Vowel quality has never been an issue for /a/, /i/ and /u/, but has been much discussed for /e/ and /o/. Zamenhof recommended pronouncing the vowels /e/ and /o/ as mid  at all times. Kalocsay and Waringhien gave more complicated recommendations. For example, they recommended pronouncing stressed /e/, /o/ as short open-mid  in closed syllables and long close-mid  in open syllables. However, this is widely considered unduly elaborate, and Zamenhof's recommendation of using mid qualities is considered the norm. For many speakers, however, the pronunciation of /e/ and /o/ reflects the details of their native language.

Epenthesis
However, Zamenhof stated that in "severely regular" speech such epenthesis would not occur.

Other speakers, however, mark the hiatus by a change of intonation, such as by raising the pitch of the stressed vowel: .

As in many languages, fricatives may become affricates after a nasal, via an epenthetic stop. Thus, the neologism  ('sense', as in the five senses) may be pronounced the same as the fundamental word  ('sense, meaning'), and the older term for the former, may be preferable.

Poetic elision

Vowel elision is allowed with the grammatical suffix -o of singular nominative nouns, and the a of the article la, though this rarely occurs outside of poetry:  ('from the heart').

Normally semivowels are restricted to offglides in diphthongs.

Assimilation
However, he stated that "severely regular" speech would not have such variation from his ideal of 'one letter, one sound'. Nonetheless, although the desirability of such allophony may be debated, the question almost never arises as to whether the m in  should remain bilabial or should assimilate to labiodental f, because this assimilation is nearly universal in human language. Indeed, where the orthography allows (e.g. 'bonbon'), we see that assimilation can occur.

In addition, speakers of many languages (including Zamenhof's, though not always English) have regressive voicing assimilation, when two obstruents (consonants that occur in voiced-voiceless pairs) occur next to each other. Zamenhof did not mention this directly, but did indicate it indirectly, in that he didn't create compound words with adjacent obstruents that have mixed voicing.
Indeed, Kalocsay & Waringhien state that when voiced and voiceless consonants are adjacent, the assimilation of one of them is "inevitable". It is sometimes claimed that kz is properly pronounced exactly as written, with mixed voicing, despite the fact that assimilation to  occurs in Russian, English (including the words 'example' and 'exist'), Polish (where it is even spelled ), French and many other languages.

{|class=wikitable
|+Voicing assimilation
|-
!Voiceless obstruent
| p ||t ||c ||ĉ ||k ||f ||s ||ŝ ||ĥ
|-
!Pronunciation before any voiced obstruent but v| b ||d ||dz ||ĝ ||g ||v ||z ||ĵ ||
|-
| colspan=10| 
|-
!Voiced obstruent
| b ||d ||dz ||ĝ ||g ||v ||z ||ĵ
|-
!Pronunciation before a voiceless obstruent
| p ||t ||c ||ĉ ||k ||f ||s ||ŝ
|}

V is never found before any consonant  in Zamenhof's writing, because that would force it to contrast with ŭ.

Similarly, mixed sibilant sequences, as in the polymorphemic  ('to scatter'), tend to assimilate in rapid speech, sometimes completely.

Partial to full devoicing of the sonorant is probably the norm for most speakers.

Loss of phonemic ĥ

Hearings before the Committee on Education, House of Representatives, 63rd Congress, 2nd Session 1914 March 17. The central/eastern European form for 'Chinese', has been completely replaced with the western European form, a unique exception to the general pattern, perhaps because the word  ('cinematography') already existed. This merger has had only a few complications.

Proper names and borrowings

A common source of allophonic variation is borrowed words, especially proper names, when non-Esperantized remnants of the source-language orthography remain, or when novel sequences are created in order to avoid duplicating existing roots. Such situations are unstable, and in many cases dictionaries recognize that certain spellings (and therefore pronunciations) are inadvisable. However, initial  violates Esperanto phonotactics, and by 1970 there was an alternative spelling, . This was also unsatisfactory, however, because of the geminate , and by 2000 the effort had been given up, with  now the advised spelling for both 'watt' and 'cotton-wool'. Some recent dictionaries no longer even list initial  in their index.

 Violations 
On the other hand,  ('Yiddish') was also sometimes criticized on phonotactical grounds, but was used by Zamenhof after its introduction in the Plena Vortaro as a replacement for novjuda and judgermana'' and is well established.

See also 

 Esperanto orthography

Notes

References

Phonologies by language
Phonology